These are the Kowloon West results of the 2008 Hong Kong legislative election. The election was held on 7 September 2008 and all 5 seats in Kowloon West where consisted of Yau Tsim Mong District, Sham Shui Po District and Kowloon City District were contested. Starry Lee replaced Jasper Tsang who contested the Hong Kong Island stood for the largest pro-Beijing party Democratic Alliance for the Betterment and Progress of Hong Kong. Wong Yuk-man of the newly established League of Social Democrats became the pan-democrat who received the most votes. Pro-Beijing independent, Priscilla Leung also won the last seat, beating Civic Party's Claudia Mo.

Overall results
Before election:

Change in composition:

Candidates list

See also
Legislative Council of Hong Kong
Hong Kong legislative elections
2008 Hong Kong legislative election

References

2008 Hong Kong legislative election